Engemann is a surname of German origin, originating as a surname for someone who lived in a valley. Notable people with the surname include:

Karl Engemann (born 1930), American record industry executive, producer, and entertainment industry personal manager
Paul Engemann (born 1953), American former pop musician

See also
Engman
Engelmann